The Apollo of Piombino or the Piombino Boy is a famous Greek bronze statuette in late Archaic style that depicts the god as a kouros or youth, or it may be a worshipper bringing an offering. The bronze is inlaid with copper for the boy's lips, eyebrows, and nipples. The eyes, which are missing, were of another material, perhaps bone or ivory.

It was found in 1832 at Piombino (Roman Populonia), in Etruria, in the harbor off the southwest point, and was purchased for the Musée du Louvre in 1834. Its archaic style led scholars like Reinhard Lullies and Max Hirmer to date it in the 5th century BCE and place its facture in Magna Graecia, the Hellenic culture area of southern Italy; Kenneth Clark illustrated it in The Nude (1956), Karl Schefold included it in Meisterwerke Griechischer Kunst 1960 and casts of it were to be found in university and museum study collections; one made by the Louvre has been returned to Piombino. 

Instead, B.S. Ridgeway (Ridgeway 1967)  proved it to be not simply an archaizing sculpture of the 1st century BCE, of the kind designed to appeal to a Roman with refined tastes, but a consciously fabricated Roman forgery, with a false inlaid inscription of silver in archaic lettering on the left leg. The inscription dedicates this Apollo to Athena, an anomaly.

The two sculptors responsible could not resist secreting inside the sculpture a lead tag inscribed with their names, which was found when the sculpture was conserved in 1842. One was a Tyrian émigré to Rhodes. The Louvre's website adds that a comparable work uncovered in 1977 in Pompeii, in the house of C. Julius Polybius, corroborates the hypothesis of an archaizing pastiche, made for a Roman client in the 1st century BCE.
The study of ancient Greek sculpture during the past few decades has moved away from the traditional practice of identifying sculptures based on brief literary descriptions and attempting to recognize the characteristic manner of some famous names as reflected in reproductions of their work and variants based on their style, to concentrate instead on the socio-political world in which sculpture was created and other less subjective criteria.

References and Corresponding Notes

Further reading
Brunilde Sismondo Ridgway, "The bronze Apollo from Piombino" Antike Plastik 7 pp 43–75. (1967).
R. Lullies and M. Hirmer, Greek Sculpture (New York) 1960.

5th-century BC Greek sculptures
Ancient Greek and Roman sculptures of the Louvre
Art of Magna Graecia
Bronze sculptures in Paris
Sculptures of Apollo
Ancient Greek bronze statues of the classical period
Archaeological discoveries in Italy
Statues in France
Hellenistic and Roman bronzes
Nude sculptures
1832 archaeological discoveries